Vestipitant (INN) is a drug developed by GlaxoSmithKline which acts as a selective antagonist for the NK1 receptor. It is under development as a potential antiemetic and anxiolytic drug, and as a treatment for tinnitus and insomnia.

See also 

 NK1 receptor antagonist
 Aprepitant
 Casopitant
 Fosaprepitant
 L-733,060
 Maropitant

References 

NK1 receptor antagonists
Trifluoromethyl compounds
Piperazines
Ureas
Fluoroarenes